Edythe Ferris (1897–1995) was an American artist. Her work is included in the collections of the Smithsonian American Art Museum and the National Gallery of Art, Washington.

References

1897 births
1995 deaths
20th-century American women artists